Frédéric Desmons (1832 in Brignon, Gard – 1910) was a French Calvinist priest and freemason who persuaded the Grand Orient de France in a vote to remove the term of the Great Architect of the Universe from their Constitution. This precipitated a split with the United Grand Lodge of England and the birth of liberal or Latin Freemasonry.

He studied in Nîmes and then went on to study theology in Geneva, the stronghold of Calvinism.

At death Frédéric Desmons, was buried the Cimetière à Saint-Genies-de-Malgoires, Saint-Genies-de-Malgoires, Departement du Gard, Languedoc-Roussillon, France.

References

1832 births
1910 deaths
People from Gard
French Calvinist and Reformed Christians
French Freemasons
Senators of Gard